The Lion of Flanders, or the Battle of the Golden Spurs is a major novel first published in 1838 by the Belgian writer Hendrik Conscience (1812–1883) and is an early example of historical fiction. The book focuses on the medieval Franco-Flemish War and the Battle of the Golden Spurs of 1302 in particular. It is written in Conscience's typical stylistic romanticism and has been described as the "Flemish national epic". 

Unusually for its time, The Lion of Flanders was written in Dutch. It is considered one of the founding texts of Flemish literature and became a significant work for the emerging Flemish Movement, reviving popular interest in the Battle of the Golden Spurs and Flemish medieval history as part of a modern political agenda. Despite its importance, the work has become little-read in modern times. It has nonetheless been the subject of various adaptations, including several cartoons, a television series, and a film.

Background 

Hendrik Conscience was born in Antwerp, then under French rule, in 1812 into a mixed French-Flemish family. He was brought up bilingual, speaking both French and Dutch. After briefly working as a teacher, he participated in the Belgian Revolution in 1830 and was inspired by the contemporary ideology of romantic nationalism. He served in the Belgian Army during the Ten Days' Campaign in 1831. He was demobilised in 1836 and moved to the impoverished Kempen region near the Dutch border where he began to pursue a literary career.

Conscience worked in the new genre of historical fiction which had begun to emerge elsewhere in Europe in around 1800. His early writing combined his interests in the history of Flanders with literary romanticism. His first book, In 't Wonderjaer (In the Year of Wonder) was published in 1837 and explored both themes. It was the first example of historical fiction published in Dutch and was set during the Beeldenstorm of 1566 and the revolt by Calvinists of the Spanish Netherlands against Catholic rule. Conscience was only able to publish the work with the financial support of friends and patrons including King Leopold I. Though relatively successful, the work made him little money and Conscience began work on a new book.

The innovative dimension of Conscience's work was his use of Dutch language in his writing. At the time, Belgian and Western European high culture was dominated by French which was also the established language of the upper classes and state bureaucracy across the country. Though Dutch dialects were commonly spoken in Flanders as a vernacular, their use was considered vulgar by the bourgeoisie and inappropriate in literature. Conscience, however, believed that Dutch provided a more authentic form of expression and preferred to use it, making his works unusual at the time.

Novel

Content and publication 

In 1838, Conscience published his second book, entitled De Leeuw van Vlaenderen, of de Slag der Gulden Sporen (The Lion of Flanders, or the Battle of the Golden Spurs). The book was set in Medieval Flanders and focused on the Franco-Flemish War (1297–1305). Its centerpiece was the Battle of Kortrik of 1302, commonly known as the Battle of the Golden Spurs (Guldensporenslag), in which a small Flemish force, made up of local militia, unexpectedly defeated a superior invading force from the Kingdom of France. In choosing the topic, Conscience may have been inspired by a romantic painting of the battle by the Flemish artist Nicaise de Keyser, unveiled in 1836. 

Conscience's work approaches the subject through the romance between Machteld, daughter of Robert III, Count of Flanders (the eponymous "Lion of Flanders"), and the knight Adolf van Nieuwlandt. The book famously concludes with a direct injunction to the reader:

In his foreword to the 1838 edition, Conscience explicitly stated that he intended his book to raise Flemish national consciousness and patriotism. Conscience researched the historical events by reading contemporary chronicles and his narrative frequently diverged from historical fact, contributed to the mythelogisation of the events as clash between the Flemish and French-speaking invaders.

Reception and influence 
The Encyclopædia Britannica describes De Leeuw as a "passionate epic" and compares it to the historical fiction of the Scottish writer Sir Walter Scott (1771–1832). With the immense success of the De Leeuw van Vlaanderen Conscience was widely credited as the man "who taught his people to read" (leerde zijn volk lezen) in popular culture. The work's public success confirmed Conscience's reputation as the leading Flemish novelist of his generation. By the time of his death in 1883, he had written around 100 novels and novellas. 

The publication of The Lion coincided with the emergence of the Flemish Movement which supported an increasingly assertive Flemish identity, initially cultural in nature and later increasingly political. Conscience himself believed that Flemish and Belgian patriotisms were complementary and was a Belgian nationalist. However, as a celebration of Dutch language and Flemish history the Lion became popular among flamingants and contributed to the increasing importance of the Battle of the Golden Spurs in Flemish political memory. The battle had been largely forgotten before Conscience's work but was revived in popular culture and local identity. Among other things, it inspired the flag of Flanders and the anthem "De Vlaamse Leeuw" (1847) by Hippoliet Van Peene. Today an annual public holiday is held on the battle's anniversary. It has been noted, however, that the increased status of the work in Flemish nationalist consciousness also coincided with a decreasing readership of the book itself.

Adaptations 
The Lion of Flanders has been the subject of various adaptations. At least nine comic strip adaptations have been produced; the most celebrated was by Bob De Moor and was serialised in Tintin after 1949 and published as a single volume in 1952. It was acclaimed as one of his best works. Also notable is Karel Biddeloo's loose adaptation of the work in 1984 within the De Rode Ridder series, inspired by surrealism.

The work was also adapted into a film in 1984, directed by the celebrated Flemish writer Hugo Claus, to commemorate the centenary of Conscience's death. The film was itself adapted into a television series by Claus in 1985. The work was a co-production between various private and state groups in Belgium and the Netherlands and, at 80 million Belgian francs, was the most expensive film produced in the Low Countries to date. As director, Claus attempted to stick as closely to the original text as possible. The film was a commercial and critical disaster, criticised for excessive romanticism and a Flemish-nationalist political agenda.

Notes and references

References

Bibliography

Further reading 
, part of a special issue entitled "Wereld van Conscience/Conscience in de Wereld (1812–2012)";
.

External links 
   De Leeuw van Vlaanderen (audiobook) at LibriVox
  De Leeuw van Vlaanderen (online text) at the Digitale Bibliotheek voor de Nederlandse Letteren
  De Leeuw van Vlaanderen (ebook) at Project Gutenberg
  The Lion of Flanders (ebook) in two volumes at Archive.org

Flemish literature
Romantic nationalism
1838 novels
Works set in Flanders
Bruges in fiction
Novels set in the 14th century
Fiction set in the 1300s
Belgian novels adapted into films
Novels adapted into comics
War novels
1838 in Belgium
Novels about rebels
Works about rebellions
Fiction about rebellions